Stöð 2 (literally Station 2) is an Icelandic subscription television channel, owned and operated by Sýn. Founded in 1986, it was the first privately owned television station in Iceland following the lifting of the state monopoly on television broadcasting. Sister channels under the Stöð 2 name include Stöð 2 Sport and Stöð 2 Bíó. Stöð 2 is the second oldest private television station in the Nordic countries, after MTV3 in Finland.

History

New media laws of 1986
During the big BSRB strike in the fall of 1984, almost all of RÚV's activities shut down and several illegal radio stations sprung up. As a result, consideration was given to revising the broadcasting laws during the tenure of Minister of Education Ragnhildar Helgadóttir. A new law, which allowed private radio and television stations, was approved by Alþingi on June 13, 1985, and came into effect at the beginning of 1986. Until that time, there had been two radio stations and one television station operating in Iceland, Rás 1 and Rás 2 and Ríkissjónvarpið.

Start of Stöð 2
Stöð 2 went on the air on October 9 that same year as a subscription station with a scrambled program where the subscriber had to buy a code number and enter a video code to unscramble the broadcast. Television presenter Jón Óttar and Vala Matt were prominent on the screen during the first days of the station. The line-up was made up of imported entertainment, dramatized Icelandic entertainment and news. It was difficult to get investors to participate in the activity to begin with. At the beginning of 1987, there were about five thousand subscribers, but by the end of the year there had been almost thirty thousand. At the same time, the number of employees increased and the station began to compete with RÚV for programmers and reporters, which was considered unheard of.

Unification of the brand
Many sister stations were operated under the same company, but in 2008 they were all united under the name of station 2, thus the sports station became Sýn a Stöð 2 Sport. Sirkus became Stöð 2 Extra and Fjölvarpið became Stöð 2 Fjölvarp, on the other hand, Stöð 2 Bíó kept its name.

Current Programming

Icelandic

News
 Fréttir, an evening news program, every evening at 6:30 pm
 Ísland í dag, a daily magazine covering various aspects of life in Iceland such as politics, culture and entertainment.  It also includes sport, news and weather

Global

Animation
Adventure Time
Danger Mouse
Dora the Explorer
Maya the Bee
Mia and Me
The New Adventures of Lucky Luke
The Smurfs
Teenage Mutant Ninja Turtles
Wow! Wow! Wubbzy!
Zigby

Anthology
True Detective

Clip Shows
Top 20 Funniest

Comedy

Drama

Lifestyle
Grand Designs
Grand Designs Australia
Jamie Cooks Italy
Jamie's Quick & Easy Food
Jamie's Ultimate Veg
Jamie & Jimmy's Food Fight Club

News
60 Minutes

Reality
Brother vs. Brother
First Dates
The Great British Bake Off
Love in the Wild
The X Factor: Celebrity
The X Factor UK

Science Fiction
Westworld

Sitcoms
Fresh Off the Boat
Friends
The Goldbergs
Modern Family
Mom
New Girl

Soap Operas
The Bold and the Beautiful
Neighbours

Talk Shows
Last Week Tonight with John Oliver
Real Time with Bill Maher

Past Programming

Icelandic

Children's Shows
 LazyTown

Comedy
 Spaugstofan

Drama
 Réttur, a legal drama series

Game shows
 Viltu vinna milljon?, the Icelandic version of Who Wants to Be a Millionaire?.

News
 Kompás, A weekly newsmagazine
 Silfur Egils, Sunday talkshow with interviews of those who made the news in the past week

Reality
 Idol stjörnuleit, the Icelandic version of Pop Idol and related shows
 The X Factor, the Icelandic version

Sitcoms
 Dagvaktin
 Fangavaktin, a comedy series continuation of Næturvaktin and Dagvaktin
 Næturvaktin

Sketch Shows
 Fóstbræður

Talk Shows
 Sjálfstætt fólk, an interview and talk show hosted by Jón Ársæll Þórðarson

Global

Animation

Anthology
 American Horror Story

Children's Shows

Clip Shows
 America's Funniest Home Videos

Comedy

Documentary
 You Are What You Eat

Drama

Game Shows
 Fear Factor
 Total Wipeout
 Wipeout

Lifestyle
 The F Word

Mini-series
 Mildred Pierce

News
 Entertainment Tonight

Reality

Science Fiction

Sitcoms

Sketch Shows
 Little Britain
 The Muppet Show

Soap Operas
 Dallas
 Doctors
 Falcon Crest
 Hollyoaks
 Melrose Place

Talk Shows
 The Daily Show
 The Doctors
 The Oprah Winfrey Show
 Vibe

Western
 Breaking Bad

See also
 Bylgjan
 Fréttablaðið

References

External links
 

Television channels in Iceland
Television channels and stations established in 1986
Companies based in Reykjavík